Konstantin Wedel (born 22 November 1993) is a German long-distance runner. In 2020, he competed in the men's race at the 2020 World Athletics Half Marathon Championships held in Gdynia, Poland.

In 2012, he competed in the men's 3000 metres steeplechase event at the 2012 World Junior Championships in Athletics held in Barcelona, Spain. In 2015, he competed in the men's 3000 metres steeplechase event at the 2015 European Athletics U23 Championships held in Tallinn, Estonia.

References

External links 
 

Living people
1993 births
Place of birth missing (living people)
German male middle-distance runners
German male long-distance runners
German male steeplechase runners
German male cross country runners
21st-century German people